Cormatin is a commune in the Saône-et-Loire department in the region of Bourgogne-Franche-Comté in eastern France.

The village, on the river Grosne, is home to a castle.

Geography
The Grosne forms part of the commune's south-western border, then flows northward through the western part of the commune.

See also
Communes of the Saône-et-Loire department

References

Communes of Saône-et-Loire